Washington Township is one of the twelve townships of Sandusky County, Ohio, United States.  As of the 2000 census, 2,396 people lived in the township, 1,769 of whom lived in the unincorporated portions of the township.

Geography
Located in the northwestern part of the county, it borders the following townships:
Harris Township, Ottawa County - north
Salem Township, Ottawa County - northeast corner, north of Rice Township
Rice Township - northeast, south of Salem Township
Sandusky Township - east
Ballville Township - southeast corner
Jackson Township - south
Scott Township - southwest corner
Madison Township - west
Woodville Township - northwest

Four villages are located in Washington Township:
Part of Elmore in the northwest
Part of Gibsonburg in the west
Part of Helena in the southwest
Lindsey in the northeast

Washington Township also contains the unincorporated community of Hessville.

Name and history
It is one of forty-three Washington Townships statewide.

Government
The township is governed by a three-member board of trustees, who are elected in November of odd-numbered years to a four-year term beginning on the following January 1. Two are elected in the year after the presidential election and one is elected in the year before it. There is also an elected township fiscal officer, who serves a four-year term beginning on April 1 of the year after the election, which is held in November of the year before the presidential election. Vacancies in the fiscal officership or on the board of trustees are filled by the remaining trustees.

References

External links
County website

Townships in Sandusky County, Ohio
Townships in Ohio